Shanghai Waigaoqiao Free Trade Zone, was the first Free Trade Zone to be established in China. It is situated in the North East of Pudong District, near the end of Metro Line 6.  It was incorporated as part of the newly developed China (Shanghai) Pilot Free-Trade Zone on September29, 2013.

References

Special Economic Zones of China
Economy of Shanghai
Pudong
Township-level divisions of Shanghai